Mokroye is a rural locality (a village) in Karachevsky District, Bryansk Oblast, Russia. The population was 75 as of 2010. There are 2 streets.

Geography 
Mokroye is located 8 km west of Karachev (the district's administrative centre) by road. Trykovka is the nearest rural locality.

References 

Rural localities in Karachevsky District